Kallat peak is one of the highest mountains located near Guzun village in Khwahan District in the North East of Afghanistan.

Mountains of Afghanistan